Hip Hop You Haven't Heard is the debut EP by New York City-based rap group Northern State. It was self-released in 2002, and was originally intended to be a demo. As of 2003, it had gone out of print.

Reception and impact
Hip Hop You Haven't Heard ended up getting Northern State a considerable amount of exposure, with some critics comparing its sound to early Beastie Boys music. Pitchfork Media also noted the sincere sound of their rapping on the EP. One favorable review the album received was written by Robert Christgau, who gave it a four star (out of five) review in Rolling Stone. This review, in which Christgau praised Northern State as "everything you want underground hip-hop to be", sparked criticism from other rap critics, who argued that the band was guilty of cultural appropriation. The review has also been credited with helping the EP, and by extension Northern State themselves, get more publicity.

Track listing

References

2002 debut EPs
Self-released EPs
Northern State (band) albums